California Rehabilitation Institute is a physical medicine and rehabilitation hospital located in Century City, California.  The hospital is a joint venture of UCLA and Cedars-Sinai Medical Center.  The hospital opened in July 2016 and is being operated by Select Medical Corporation.

US News and World Report Rankings 
According to the U.S. News & World Report annual ranking of hospitals, as of 2022, California Rehabilitation Institute was ranked 22nd among the best hospitals for rehabilitation in California.

Leadership 
Chief Executive Officer of the California Rehabilitation Institute is Richard Montmeny.

Chief of Staff and Medical Director of the California Rehabilitation Institute is Dr. Christopher Boudakian.

References 

Hospitals in Los Angeles County, California
University of California, Los Angeles
Cedars-Sinai Medical Center
Hospitals established in 2016